Ómarsdóttir is an Icelandic patronym. Notable people with the surname include:

Kristín Ómarsdóttir (born 1962), Icelandic author, poet, playwright, and visual artist
Katrín Ómarsdóttir (born 1987), Icelandic footballer

Icelandic-language surnames